After All is a 1929 play by the British writer John Van Druten. After a West End run at the Apollo Theatre it transferred to Broadway in 1931.

Film adaptation
In 1932 it was adapted into an American film New Morals for Old by MGM starring Robert Young and Lewis Stone.

References

Bibliography
 Goble, Alan. The Complete Index to Literary Sources in Film. Walter de Gruyter, 1999.
 Wearing, J. P. The London Stage 1920-1929: A Calendar of Productions, Performers, and Personnel. Rowman & Littlefield, 2014.

1929 plays
Plays by John Van Druten
British plays adapted into films
West End plays